Cleaveland may refer to:

People with the surname
 Agnes Morley Cleaveland
 Cleaveland (whaling family)
 Henry W. Cleaveland
 Moses Cleaveland, founder of Cleveland, Ohio
 Norman Cleaveland
 Parker Cleaveland
 Sarah Cleaveland
 William Cleaveland

Places
 Cleaveland, Ohio, United States, Cleveland's original name
 Cleaveland Manor, Isle of Wight, England

See also
 Cleveland (disambiguation)